The 1982 Arkansas State Indians football team was an American football team that represented the Arkansas State University as a member of the Southland Conference during the 1982 NCAA Division I-AA football season. In their fourth season under head coach Larry Lacewell, the Indians compiled an overall record of 5–6 with a mark of 2–3 in conference play, tying for third place in the Southland.

Schedule

References

Arkansas State
Arkansas State Red Wolves football seasons
Arkansas State Indians football